Ọlábísí is both a surname and a given name of Yoruba origin meaning "a combination of prestige, success and wealth has given birth to more". It may refer to:

Given name
Olabisi Afolabi (born 1975), Nigerian athlete
Olabisi "Bisi" Johnson (born 1997), American gridiron football player
Olabisi Onabanjo (1927 – 1990), Nigerian politician
Olabisi Obafunke Silva (1962 – 2019), Woman Nigerian Curator
Olabisi Ugbebor (born 1951), Nigerian professor

Surname
Olagoke Olabisi, (born 1943), Nigerian-American author, engineer and scientist
Ronke Olabisi (born 1976), American engineer
Wande Olabisi, Nigerian baseball player

See also